Scuppers Icefalls is a prominent line of icefalls, 5 nautical miles (9 km) long and nearly 400 m high, between Mount Razorback and Mount Nespelen in Convoy Range, Victoria Land. The icefalls are the main outflow draining from Flight Deck Neve into Benson Glacier. One of a group of nautical names in Convoy Range, this descriptive name is derived from the drainage of the feature, suggestive of stormwater on a ship's deck draining through scuppers along the rail. Named by a New Zealand Antarctic Research Program (NZARP) field party, 1989–90.

Icefalls of Antarctica
Landforms of Victoria Land
Scott Coast